Anubias is a genus of aquatic and semi-aquatic flowering plants in the family Araceae, native to tropical central and western Africa. They primarily grow in rivers and streams, but can also be found in marshes. They are characterized by broad, thick, dark leaves that come in many different forms. The genus was revised in 1979 and since then its nomenclature has been stable. Species can be determined by using mostly characteristics of the inflorescence. Because of the often shady places where the plants grow, the genus was named after the Egyptian god Anubis, the god of the afterlife. The genus was first described in 1857 by Heinrich Wilhelm Schott, with A. afzelii as its type species.

Reproduction and uses 
Anubias, most notably the varying forms of A. barteri, are commonly used in aquariums, usually attached to rocks or bogwood. In contrast to most plants, Anubias generally prefer subdued lighting and can also produce flowers underwater. In the aquarium they should be placed in shaded areas, otherwise algae will develop on the leaves.

Anubias are considered by many aquarists some of the easiest plants to maintain, since their light and nutrient requirements are very low and also because herbivorous fish will not eat it (with a few exceptions). This is why Anubias are some of the few plants which can be used in aquariums with African cichlids and goldfishes.

Reproduction in artificial environments can be accomplished by stolon division or from side shoots. The stolon must always be above the substrate in order to survive, otherwise it will rot and the plant dies. Rather than planting Anubias directly into the soil, they should be attached to a piece of rock or driftwood, as they are more likely to grow and thrive when the rhizome and roots are left exposed instead of buried. It is also possible to propagate Anubias by seed.

The natural growth rate of all species in this genus is rather slow. Usually, they produce a leaf every 3 weeks, or even slower. And while they were once thought to be among the few plants that do not respond to CO2 addition, .

The most commonly available species of this genus is Anubias barteri Schott, which is polymorphic and subdivided into several varieties. The largest members of the genus are Anubias gigantea Chevalier ex Hutchinson and Anubias heterophylla Engler. Their leaf-stems can grow up to 83 cm, with leaves 40 cm long and 14 cm broad with lateral lobes up to 28 cm long and 10 cm broad. The smallest representative is Anubias barteri var. nana (Engler) Crusio, with a height up to 10 cm and with leaves up to 6 cm long and 3 cm broad.

Anubias can be grown emersed (above water). For this reason they may be used in paludariums.

Species and varieties 
 Anubias afzelii Schott
 Narrow-leafed, medium-sized Anubias
 Characteristics: plant with stolon
 Leaf-stem: up to 20 cm
 Leaves: 13–35 cm long, 3–13 cm broad
 Height in aquarium: 25 – 30 cm
Optimal conditions:
 Temperature: 22 - 28 °C
 pH: 6.0 - 7.0
 Water hardness: 2 dGH - 6 dGH
 Position in aquarium: middle to back
 Usual growth rate: one leaf every 2 months

Anubias barteri Schott

Common varieties:

Anubias barteri var. angustifolia (Engler) Crusio
 Synonym: Anubias lanceolata f. angustifolia Engler
 Narrow leaves, similar to afzelii, but much smaller
 Leaf-stem: up to 32 cm
 Leaves: up to 18 cm long, up to 3.5 cm wide
 Height in aquarium: 10 – 15 cm
Optimal conditions:
 Temperature: 20 - 27 °C
 pH: 5.5 - 8.0
 Water hardness: < 8 dGH
 Position in aquarium: middle
 Usual growth rate: one leaf every 2 months

Anubias barteri var. barteri
 Compact, heart-shaped anubias
 Leaf-stem: up to 23 cm
 Leaves: 7–23 cm long, 4–11 cm wide
 Height in aquarium: 25 – 45 cm
Optimal conditions:
 Temperature: 20 - 27 °C
 pH: 5.5 - 9.0
 Water hardness: < 20 dGH
 Position in aquarium: back
 Usual growth rate: one leaf every 3 months

Anubias barteri var. caladiifolia Engler
 Heart-shaped anubias
 Leaf-stem: up to 54 cm
 Leaves: 10–23 cm long, 5–14 cm wide
 Height in aquarium: 7 – 30 cm
Optimal conditions:
 Temperature: 20 - 27 °C
 pH: 5.5 - 8.0
 Water hardness: < 20 dGH
 Position in aquarium: middle to back
 Usual growth rate: one leaf every 2 months

Anubias barteri var. glabra N. E. Brown
 Synonyms: Anubias lanceolata N. E. Brown, Anubias minima Chevalier.
 Narrow-leafed, large anubias
 Leaf-stem: up to 35 cm long
 Leaves: spear-shaped, up to 21 cm long, 9 cm wide
 Height in aquarium: 30 – 50 cm
Optimal conditions:
 Temperature: 22 - 27 °C
 pH: 5.5 - 8.0
 Water hardness: < 20 dGH
 Position in aquarium: back
 Usual growth rate: 4 - 8 leaves per year

Anubias barteri var. nana (Engler) Crusio
 Synonym: Anubias nana Engler
 Dwarf, creeping, with heart-shaped leaves
 Leaf-stem: up to 5 cm long
 Leaves: up to 6 cm long and 3 cm wide
 Height in aquarium: 5 – 10 cm
Optimal conditions:
 Temperature: 22 - 27 °C
 pH: 5.5 - 9.0
 Water hardness: 3 - 10 dGH
 Position in aquarium: front
 Usual growth rate: one leaf every month

Anubias gigantea Chevalier ex Hutchinson
 Synonyms: Anubias gigantea var. tripartita Chevalier, Anubias hastifolia var. robusta Engler
 Large arrow-shaped leaves
 Leaf-stem: up to 83 cm long
 Leaves: up to 30 cm long and 14 cm wide, with large lateral lobes up to 28 cm long and 10 cm broad
 Seldom used in aquariums

Anubias gilletii De Wildeman & Durand
 Initially heart-shaped, later with long rear fringes
 Leaf-stem: up to 40 cm
 Leaves: arrow-shaped, 25 cm long, 12 – 13 cm wide, lateral lobes up to 13 cm long
 Height in aquarium: 25 – 40 cm
Optimal conditions:
 Temperature: 22 - 27 °C
 pH: 6.0 - 8.0
 Water hardness: 4 - 10 dGH
 Position in aquarium: back
 Usual growth rate: 2 - 6 leaves per year

Anubias gracilis Chevalier ex Hutchinson
 Whether this is a separate species or another variety of Anubias barteri is doubtful
 Leaf-stem: up to 33 cm
 Leaves: triangular heart-shaped, 12 cm long, 4–10 cm wide, lateral lobes up to 7 cm long and 3 cm wide
 Height in aquarium: 20 – 30 cm
Optimal conditions:
 Temperature: 24 - 27 °C
 pH: 6.0 - 8.0
 Water hardness: 5 - 12 dGH
 Position in aquarium: middle to back
 Usual growth rate: 2 - 6 leaves per year

Anubias hastifolia Engler
 Synonyms: Amauriella hastifolia (Engler) Hepper, Anubias hastifolia var. sublobata Engler, Anubias auriculata Engler, Amauriella auriculata (Engler) Hepper, Anubias haullevilleana De Wildeman, Anubias laurentii De Wildeman, Amauriella obanensis Rendle, Amauriella talbotii Rendle
 Leaves: long heart-shaped
 Leaf-stem: up to 67 cm long
 Leaves: up to 33 cm long and 14 cm wide, lateral lobes up to 26 cm long and 8 cm broad
 Height in aquarium: 30 – 50 cm
Optimal conditions:
 Temperature: 22 - 27 °C
 pH: 6.0 - 8.0
 Water hardness: < 20 dGH
 Position in aquarium: middle to back
 Usual growth rate: 2 - 6 leaves per year

Anubias heterophylla Engler
 Synonyms: Anubias congensis N. E. Brown, Anubias congensis var. crassispadix Engler, Anubias affinis De Wildeman, Anubias engleri De Wildeman, Anubias bequaerti De Wildeman, Anubias undulata (trade name)
 Very large species, for tall aquariums
 Leaf-stem: up to 66 cm long
 Leaves: 38 cm long, 13 cm wide, sometimes with very short basal lobes
 Height in aquarium: 25 – 60 cm
Optimal conditions:
 Temperature: 24 - 27 °C
 pH: 5.5 - 8.0
 Water hardness: 5 - 12 dGH
 Position in aquarium: back
 Usual growth rate: 2 - 4 leaves per year

Anubias pynaertii De Wildeman
 Leaf-stem: up to 45 cm
 Leaves: up to 29 cm long and 14 cm broad

See also 
Aquatic plant
List of freshwater aquarium plant species

References

 
Araceae genera
Flora of West Tropical Africa
Flora of West-Central Tropical Africa
Flora of Angola
Aquarium plants